Seller's Wood is a Site of Special Scientific Interest on the northern outskirts of Nottingham, England. There are several wildlife ponds within the site - formed out of old clay workings excavated by for use by local brickworks, long since closed. Entrance is from Sellers Wood Drive, Bulwell.

There is a circular walk of approximately 30 minutes with distant views and a view of the M1 motorway across farm fields from the northern edge.

External links 
 Sellers Wood. More information and photo gallery
 Woodland Trust Sellers Wood
 

Sites of Special Scientific Interest in Nottinghamshire
Nottinghamshire Wildlife Trust